Bahri Tufina (January 11, 1923 - Dec 18, 1997) was an Albanian master watchmaker, famous for his valuable contributions to the Albanian and Southern Europe watchmaking scene.

Biography
Born in January 11, 1923 in Tiranë, capital of Albania, he was born in a prominent native family that were well-known for their watchmaking practices. Bahri's father Shaban Tufina and uncle Haxhi Tufina worked as successful watchmakers for the well-known Eberhard Swiss company and owned a lot of businesses that dealt with watchmaking, jewelry, and trading. His uncle was the designated sales representative for Omega and had exclusive rights for Omega products in the area. The roots of this family go as far back as the year of 1822, when Ismail Tufina assembled the clock mechanisms in the Tirana Clock Tower. Bahri Tufina and Zija Tufina tended to the Clock Tower of Tirana up until 1973 when the communists forbade them from doing so. This decision was made based on the communist party’s unfair prejudice against such wealthy families.

Raised in a family that was deeply involved in watchmaking, he learned how to craft and repair different types of clocks and watches. Two of this family’s standing clocks were gifted to the Albanian Prime Minister and Presidential Rooms. They bear the name Tufina Brothers (Albanian: Vllazën Tufina) and can still be found at these two institutions today.  However, what intrigued Bahri Tufina the most were mechanical wristwatches. He would later be known as the creator of the first and only made-in-Albania timepiece, a table clock named “Tirana Alarm Clock” (Albanian: Sahat me zile Tirana). 

Bahri had to go to Italy for kidney surgery. In 1940, amazed by the country’s architecture, he picked up photography which would later become one of his greatest passions. Throughout his life, he documented his and his family’s work in watchmaking. His photographs make up the greatest part of Tufina's archive today.

He returned to Albania where he continued working under the Tufina name. In 1948, after the establishment of the Socialist People's Republic of Albania, Bahri Tufina was imprisoned and tortured for almost one year under the Law of Extraordinary Confiscations. The communist party seized everything in his family’s possession, including their assets, properties, shops, money, tools, watches, and jewelry.

Even after facing such inhumane treatment, Bahri Tufina continued to practice his family's art. After being stripped away of all his properties and assets, he was determined to create a new life for himself and his children. During the 1960s, he gave lessons on watchmaking at the Tirana Factory - an educational entity that he envisioned, built and led on his own. This school offered 2-3 year study programs which produced hundreds of new watchmakers. He passed his love for watchmaking to his children and grandchildren, which have kept this tradition alive to this day. 

In his later years he was deeply disappointed as the state failed to return or provide compensation for any of his family’s 23 confiscated stores and other properties. They didn’t receive any assistance in reopening the shops where they could practice their watchmaking operations. In such circumstances, Enis Tufina - the owner of Tufina watches representative German brands  “Theorema” and "Pionier” - decided to reestablish his family’s watchmaking activities after moving to Germany.

References

 

Watchmakers (people)
1923 births
1997 deaths